Marionia ghanensis is a species of sea slug, a dendronotid nudibranch, a marine gastropod mollusc in the family Tritoniidae.

Distribution
This species was described from Ghana.

References

Endemic fauna of Ghana
Tritoniidae
Gastropods described in 2017